Točak may refer to:

 Radomir Mihajlović Točak, a Serbian rock musician
 Točak, Croatia, a village near Slunj